The 1989 IAAF Grand Prix Final was the fifth edition of the season-ending competition for the IAAF Grand Prix track and field circuit, organised by the International Association of Athletics Federations. It was held on 1 September at the Stade Louis II in Fontvieille, Monaco. Saïd Aouita (5000 metres) and Paula Ivan (1500 metres) were the overall points winners of the tournament, both repeating their victories from the previous year's competition. Ivan became the first woman to win the series twice. This was also Aouita's third career win at the completion – a feat which never went matched in the event's history.

Medal summary

Men

Women

Points leaders

Men

Women

References
IAAF Grand Prix Final. GBR Athletics. Retrieved on 2015-01-17.

External links
IAAF Grand Prix Final archive from IAAF

Grand Prix Final
Grand Prix Final
International athletics competitions hosted by Monaco
IAAF Grand Prix Final